Boiler Room is a 2000 American crime drama film written and directed by Ben Younger and starring Giovanni Ribisi, Vin Diesel, Nia Long, Ben Affleck, Nicky Katt, Scott Caan, Tom Everett Scott, Ron Rifkin, and Jamie Kennedy. The film was conceived when screenwriter Ben Younger interviewed for a job at brokerage firm Sterling Foster. Younger said, "I walked in and immediately realized, 'This is my movie.' I mean, you see these kids and know something is going on."

The film was nominated for several awards including a Black Reel Award, a British Independent Film Award, and two Independent Spirit Awards. It won the Special Jury Prize at the 2000 Deauville Film Festival.

Plot
In 1999, Seth Davis, a 19-year-old Queens College dropout, runs an unlicensed casino in his home near the campus, catering to college students. Although he earns a successful living, he is a disappointment to his father, Marty, a New York City federal judge. One night, his cousin Adam stops by the casino to play blackjack, bringing a rich associate named Greg Weinstein along with him. Greg recruits Seth to join J. T. Marlin, a brokerage firm based somewhere off the Long Island Expressway, promising him that he has the opportunity to get rich.

Arriving at J. T. Marlin, Seth attends a group interview and learns from Jim Young, one of the co-founders of the firm, what is expected of his work and also how he can become a millionaire, which he assures to the new applicants will happen within three years of their first day of employment at J. T. Marlin. The firm's techniques of selling are through cold calling investors to sell stock, and Seth joins as a stockbroker trainee, having to close 40 accounts and pass a  Series 7 Exam to begin working independently. The brokers love to quote insider trader Gordon Gekko from Wall Street, seeing him as a role model. He is soon making a good living, as well as winning his father's approval and embarking on a romance with Abbie Halpert, a secretary and Greg's ex-girlfriend.

Gradually, he learns that J. T. Marlin is a chop shop brokerage firm that runs a "pump and dump", using its brokers to create artificial demand in the stock of expired or fake companies, and speculative penny stocks. When the firm is done pumping the stock, the firm founders sell and trade for legitimate stocks for record profits. However, the investors then have no one to sell their shares to in the market when the price of the stock plummets, causing them to lose their investment. The FBI agents investigating the firm decide to pursue Seth, hoping to make him their informant.

Seth passes his Series 7 Exam and becomes a broker. He then contacts Harry Reynard, the purchasing manager of a gourmet foods company. Although Harry is reluctant, he gives in after Seth lies that the stock is guaranteed to go up in value; Seth sells him 100 shares at $8 each. When the stock's value drops, Harry calls back to ask why the stock has done so poorly, only to have Seth persuade him to buy more worthless shares. The stock eventually tanks, costing Harry his savings and his family.

Feeling guilty for scamming Harry, Seth resolves to shut the firm down. Marty then disowns him, accusing him of destroying peoples' lives. Seth investigates further, discovering that the firm's founders are already preparing to abandon J. T. Marlin, destroy the records, and cut ties with their employees to re-brand and start their scheme under a new name, leaving their victims to face a lengthy legal battle without much hope of recovering their money. Seth shows up at his father's office and tearfully explains that he shut down his casino and went along with a highly criminal line of work that he thought was legal to gain his family's approval. He then requests that his father help him on an IPO scheme to rob the firm of their money and bring them down, hoping that his actions, while illegal, will recover enough money to help J. T. Marlin's victims. Although Marty initially refuses due to the risk of losing his judgeship, he calls Seth the next day, reconciling with him and offering to help with the scheme.

Seth is eventually arrested by the FBI for the violation of 26 SEC and NASD regulations, and is brought into their custody along with his father, as the bureau had discovered their IPO scheme from a tape-recorded phone conversation. The FBI offer him federal immunity if he agrees to testify against J. T. Marlin once all the suspects are brought into court, and threaten to involve Marty in order to assure Seth's cooperation. Seth asserts that he will testify against the firm and provide strong evidence of their illegal practices only if his father is released. He and the agents come to an agreement on this, with Seth being kept overnight. After that, it is implied that he will be free to go as the FBI will proceed to raid the building and prosecute everybody else.

Seth returns to work the next day and goes along with the FBI's instructions to make copies of investment files onto a floppy disk to use as evidence. Before leaving, Seth attempts to get Harry's money back. He lies to Michael Brantley, the company's founder, by explaining that the firm can lose a lot of money by refusing to continue to do business with Harry Reynard, who Seth makes out to be an important prospect at a make-or-break point. Brantley agrees to proceed, offering him shares of the next IPO, with a caveat that he cannot sell the shares until the firm has sold off theirs. In order to sell the shares behind Michael's back, Seth needs a sell ticket signed by a senior broker, something that his direct supervisor, Greg, has explicitly said that he would never do. He seeks a signing from Chris Varick, explaining that he may as well "do one thing right" in helping a severely hit investor make his money back, now that the firm will be raided and, soon enough, there will be no future in continuing business at J. T. Marlin. Chris reluctantly agrees, and proceeds to escape the building in an attempt to flee federal enforcement. Seth walks out to his car, deciding what to do with his life now that his ties with J. T. Marlin are finished. As he departs in his car, several FBI cars, buses, and tow trucks enter the parking lot, with agents storming out ready to raid the building.

Cast

Production
In interviews, Ben Younger said he was inspired to write the script for the film after going to a job interview at a Long Island-based brokerage firm that turned out to be a pyramid scheme. Younger said he used a speech given by a top broker to the would-be trainees as the model for the lecture the Jim Young character makes early in the film. Jordan Belfort, a former stockbroker who would write The Wolf of Wall Street, claimed that the movie was also loosely based on his rise and fall. Younger spent two years interviewing stockbrokers at boiler rooms, where callers aggressively peddle often fraudulent investments to consumers. Younger sold his script on the condition that he direct. Artisan Entertainment initially backed the production and helped bring actors Giovanni Ribisi, Vin Diesel, and Affleck to the project, but later backed out. New Line Cinema then stepped in for distribution.

Release

Box office
The film opened in the United States on February 18, 2000, alongside Hanging Up, Pitch Black and The Whole Nine Yards, grossing $6.7 million on its opening weekend. Eventually, the film grossed $17 million domestically and $11.8 million in other territories, with a worldwide total of $28.8 million.

Critical response
On Rotten Tomatoes the film has an approval rating of 66% based on reviews from 101 critics. The site's consensus is: "Its ending is disappointingly tidy, but Boiler Room boasts just enough sharp writing and brisk pacing to make getting there worthwhile." On Metacritic the film has a score of 63 out of 100 based on reviews from 34 critics, indicating "generally favorable reviews" Audiences surveyed by CinemaScore gave the film a grade C+ on scale of A to F.

Multiple critics noted the film's echoes of other corporate greed films like Wall Street and Glengarry Glenn Ross. Malcolm Johnson of the Hartford Courant wrote "Affleck, the best-known actor in the ensemble, proves no match for Alec Baldwin of 'Glengarry,' who played a similar character in David Mamet's look at a phony real estate operation." He also said "the screenplay misses the verbal pyrotechnics of both [Oliver] Stone and Mamet." A. O. Scott of The New York Times wrote Giovanni Ribisi "captures Seth's man-child suavity as well as his childish sensitivity, and the sweetness underneath his cynicism", and "Nia Long brings wit and patience to the underwritten role of Marlin's receptionist and Seth's love interest, a black woman surrounded by white guys trying to act like homeboys." Vin Diesel was also cited as being one of the more "likable" characters at the brokerage firm.

Roger Ebert of the Chicago Sun-Times gave the film 3.5 out of 4 stars and wrote: "Has the high-octane feel of real life, closely observed." Emanuel Levy of Variety gave the film a mixed review and said while it "begins extremely well as a saga of greed and conspicuous consumption...it gradually loses its bite." Levy also praised Affleck for his performance. James Berardinelli of ReelViews gave it 3 out of 4 stars and called it "A compelling movie-going experience." Berardinelli praised the attention to detail and said the film achieves "the same sort of insight into stock brokering that Glengarry Glenn Ross offered into sales. In fact, this aspect of the film is what makes Boiler Room a compelling movie-going experience. The characters and plot become secondary to the setting and atmosphere."

Awards and nominations

See also

 Bridge financing
 Boiler room (business)
 Glengarry Glen Ross
 The Wolf of Wall Street
 The Big Short
 Rogue Trader
 Margin Call

Notes

References

External links

 
 

2000 films
2000 crime drama films
American business films
American crime drama films
2000s English-language films
Films set in New York City
Trading films
Wall Street films
Films about con artists
Films directed by Ben Younger
2000 directorial debut films
American independent films
2000 independent films
Films produced by Suzanne Todd
New Line Cinema films
2000s American films